Our Friend Tili is a 1981 Albanian coming of age film directed by Fehmi Hoshafi and starring Elida Janushi, Arben Latifi, Lutfi Hoxha.	It won a gold medal at the 1982 International Children's Film Festival in Salerno.

Cast
 Elida Janushi
 Arben Latifi		
 Lutfi Hoxha	
 Zyliha Miloti	
 Vasillaq Vangjeli
 Zef Bushati

References

External links
 

Albanian comedy-drama films
1981 films
Albanian-language films
1981 comedy-drama films